Leading Lady Parts is a 2018 short film directed by Jessica Swale. Inspired by the Time's Up movement, the film stars several A-list actresses auditioning for a leading lady role, offering a critique of the casting process. It premiered on BBC Four in 2018 and is available for free on YouTube.

Synopsis 
Several A-list actresses are auditioning for a film role known as the "leading lady part". The casting directors ask increasingly ridiculous requests of the actresses, including for them to lose weight, smile more, undress, put on more makeup, and, in the case of British Asian actress Gemma Chan, if she could "be more white". Finally, Tom Hiddleston auditions and is immediately cast.

Cast

Production 
The idea for a film inspired by the Time's Up movement was put forth by British actress Gemma Arterton after she had attended several meetings as part of the movement. Jessica Swale wrote the script and within three weeks the cast and funding had been secured. It was filmed over the span of a few days at Warner Bros. Studio, Leavesden. The film was produced by Arterton's production company Rebel Park Productions, with Arterton crediting Felicity Jones for the idea of the film as a collaboration. Actresses who appeared as themselves in the film included Gemma Chan, Emilia Clarke, Lena Headey, Felicity Jones, Wunmi Mosaku, Katie Leung, Stacy Martin, and Florence Pugh. The casting directors were played by Gemma Arterton, Catherine Tate, and Anthony Welsh. While the film was originally to be produced by an all-female crew, this proved impossible for the filmmakers. The film is the first in a planned series of short films that address similar issues relating to the Time's Up and Me Too movements.

References

External links 

 

2018 television films
2018 short films
British television films
British short films
British feminist films
2010s feminist films
2018 films
2010s English-language films
2010s British films